"It's My Time" is a song written by Tammy Hyler, Billy Crain and Kim Tribble, and recorded by American country music artist Martina McBride.  It was released in December 2000 as the fourth single from McBride's album Emotion. The song peaked at number 11 on the U.S. Billboard Hot Country Singles & Tracks and at number 2 on the U.S. Billboard Bubbling Under Hot 100. It was her first solo single since 1997's "Cry on the Shoulder of the Road" to miss the Top 10.

Chart performance
"It's My Time" debuted at number 63 on the U.S. Billboard Hot Country Singles & Tracks for the week of December 23, 2000.

References

2000 singles
1999 songs
Martina McBride songs
Songs written by Billy Crain
Song recordings produced by Paul Worley
RCA Records singles
Songs written by Kim Tribble
Songs written by Tammy Hyler